Professor Genius is a character, who originated in the comic strip Little Nemo in Slumberland  by Winsor McCay and other subsequent media.  He is the right-hand man to King Morpheus, the ruler of Slumberland. His main jobs are to look after the Princess, Little Nemo, and make sure the King's things are in order.

Little Nemo comics
In the original Little Nemo comics, musical and vaudeville, Professor Genius appeared with a different personality and appearance as "Dr. Pill."

Little Nemo: Adventures in Slumberland

In the 1992 movie Little Nemo: Adventures in Slumberland, Professor Genius is given the task of bringing Little Nemo to Slumberland by dirigible and is successful. Along the way he looks after Little Nemo and introduces him to King Morpheus and Princess Camille. He also brings Nemo to his prince lessons, which Nemo detests. After the Nightmare King is released, Professor Genius is one of the few that join Nemo's group, to make a rescue attempt to save the King.

He is voiced in the movie by the late René Auberjonois.

Appearances in video games 
While most of the major characters in the film appeared in the video game  Little Nemo: The Dream Master, the Professor was absent. However, in the Nemo Arcade game, he was seen in the opening scene and the ending scene

References

American comics characters
Fictional professors
Comics characters introduced in 1905
Male characters in comics